The ARIA Music Award for Album of the Year, is an award presented at the annual ARIA Music Awards, which recognises "the many achievements of Aussie artists across all music genres", since 1987. It is handed out by the Australian Recording Industry Association (ARIA), an organisation whose aim is "to advance the interests of the Australian record industry." The award is handed out to an Australian group or solo artist who have had an album appear in the ARIA Top 100 Albums Chart between the eligibility period, and is voted for by a judging academy, which consists of 1000 members from different areas of the music industry.  Both Powderfinger and Tame Impala have won the award three times.

Winners and nominees
In the following table, the winner is highlighted in a separate colour, and in boldface; the nominees are those that are not highlighted or in boldface.

References

External links

A
Album awards